A Night in the Town is a 1913 silent short film directed by Phillips Smalley and starring Pearl White and Chester Barnett. This film was released as a split-reel with An Innocent Bridegroom.  Both films are preserved in the Library of Congress collection.

Cast
Pearl White
Chester Barnett

References

External links
 A Night in the Town at IMDb.com

1913 films
American black-and-white films
Universal Pictures short films
American silent short films
1913 short films
Silent American comedy films
1913 comedy films
1910s American films